The History of Bestiality is a trilogy by the Norwegian writer Jens Bjørneboe.  It consists of the three books Moment of Freedom ("Frihetens øyeblikk", 1966), Powderhouse ("Kruttårnet", 1969) and The Silence ("Stillheten", 1973).

Moment of Freedom 
Moment of Freedom: the Heiligenberg Manuscript.

The narrator is a court usher in a small alp village ("Heiligenberg"). While observing incidents in the court, he occupies himself filling protocols with what he calls "the history of bestiality".

Powderhouse 
Powderhouse: Scientific Postscript and Last Protocol.

The narrator is now houseporter at a hospital for mentally diseased.  The staff and patients deliver lectures on themes such as the history of execution, heresy and heretics.

The Silence 
The Silence: Anti-novel and Absolutely Very Last Protocol.

The narrator is situated in an unnamed country in northern Africa. He is now occupied with themes such as the history of colonisation: how the European countries took "possession" of large parts of the world, America, Africa and Asia.

References
 Esther Greenleaf Mürer. "Annotated List of Jens Bjørneboe's Works." 
 Aarnes, Sigurd Aa. "The Problem of Evil"—Nazism in Jens Bjørneboe's writing. Translated by John Weinstock . In The Nordic Mind: Current Trends in Scandinavian Literary Criticism, edited by Frank Egholm Andersen and John Weinstock. 223–50. Lanham MD: University Presses of America, 1986. 
 Engelstad, Carl Fredrik. "Jens Bjørneboes Trilogie", Ausblick, Zeitschrift für Deutsch- Skandinavische Beziehungen ( Lübeck) 33 (1983), no. 1-2: 6-8
 Gary Kern "Bjørneboe's Great Failure: The History of Bestiality"  
 Mussari, Mark. "Farvens klang: Color Spaces in Strindberg, Branner, Dinessen and Bjørneboe." PhD. Dissertation, Univ of Washington, 1999.
 Longum, Leif. "Jens Bjørneboe and the Laughter of Tuscany." In I rapporti tra Italia e Europa del nord nella letteratura e nell'arte. Giornate scandinavie 3-5 maggio 1989, edited by Randi Langen Moen, 127–136. . Bologna: Universita di Bologna, 1992.
 Kreutzer, Helmut. "Existentielle Prosa, spiritueller Anarchismus: zum Augenblick der Freiheit von Jens Bjørneboe". In Probleme des Erzahlens in der Weltliteratur: Festschrift fur Kate Hamburger zum 75. Geburtstag, ed. Fritz Martini, 348–64. Stuttgart: Klett, 1971.

Novel series
20th-century Norwegian novels